Quercus brandegeei is a rare Mexican species of plant in the family Fagaceae, in the oak genus Quercus, section Virentes. It has been found only in the southern part of the State of Baja California Sur in northwestern Mexico.

Its habitat is restricted to stream-side locations.

The species is listed as endangered by the IUCN Red List and threatened by long-term climatic drying and habitat loss.

References

External link
 
 The mystery of Mexico's vanishing stream oaks, BBC Future

brandegeei
Endemic oaks of Mexico
Trees of Baja California Sur
Plants described in 1916
Endangered biota of Mexico
Endangered flora of North America
Taxonomy articles created by Polbot
Taxa named by Edward Alphonso Goldman